Łęczycki (feminine: Łęczycka; plural: Łęczyccy) is a Polish surname. Notable people with the surname include:

 Józef Łęczycki, Polish architect
 Mieczysław Łęczycki, Polish architect
 Mikołaj Łęczycki (1574–1653), Polish theologian

See also
 

Polish-language surnames